Sayra Fischer Lebenthal  (October 17, 1898 – March 19, 1994) was a Wall Street banker. In 1925, at the age of 27, she co-founded investment banking firm Lebenthal & Company with her husband Louis Lebenthal, and was responsible for democratizing the municipal bond business. She continued to work full time until the age of 92. After Louis’s death in 1951, Sayra became the first woman to run a Wall Street brokerage firm. Among her innovations was organizing a department exclusively for women investors.

Biography
Sayra Fischer was born to immigrants from the Russian Empire in Monmouth County, New Jersey. She was raised in Keyport, New Jersey and graduated from Keyport High School in 1915. She attended Syracuse University College of Law and graduated in 1920 as one of only two women in the class to earn a law degree. She was admitted to the New York Bar in 1923.

After marrying Louis Lebenthal in 1925, they established a bond trading partnership and sold small lots of bonds to small investors, broadening a market that had traditionally only been open to the wealthy. After her husband's death in 1951, she stayed in the business and developed a focus on tax-exempt municipal bonds for small investors. She continued to work in the company she had founded well into her 90s.

On March 19, 1994, Sayra died, aged 95, after a lengthy illness.

Honors
The Sayra Fischer Lebenthal Award for Professional Excellence in Finance is presented to a woman in the financial services profession who, like Sayra, believed in teaching women the importance of understanding their investments and taking responsibility for their financial lives.

Personal
Louis and Sayra Lebenthal helped democratize municipal bonds, which had long been almost an exclusive province of the insurers and the rich. Louis died in 1951, but Sayra kept working until her retirement at age 93 in 1992.

Sayra remarried in 1956 to I. Arnold Ross, a lawyer and former State Assemblyman. He died in 1981.

Sayra's daughter Eleanor Lebenthal Bissinger worked at the firm alongside her husband for nearly twenty years. Her son Jim Lebenthal, was the firm's chairman and spokesman, until 1995 when he shifted the responsibility for the company to his daughter Alexandra Lebenthal, one of Sayra’s five grandchildren.

References

Sources
Fritz, Roger. (2005). "Wars of Succession: The Blessings curses and Lessons that Family-Owned Firms Offer Anyone in Business". Silver Lake Publishing: 106.

1898 births
1994 deaths
New York (state) lawyers
People from Keyport, New Jersey
Syracuse University College of Law alumni
20th-century American lawyers